Joshua Ian Shipp (born February 14, 1986) is an American former professional basketball player who last played for Brose Baskets of the Basketball Bundesliga. Shipp played college basketball for the UCLA Bruins. He has played professionally in Turkey and Germany.

High school
Under coach Harvey Kitani, Shipp led the Fairfax Lions to the California Division I state title. As a junior, he helped lead his team to the City finals and received All-State underclassman and All-City second-team honors.

College
As a freshman at the University of California, Los Angeles, Shipp started 23 games for the Bruins and was named Honorable Mention All-Pac-10 Freshman. He averaged 9.3 points and 5.2 rebounds.

Shipp underwent surgery on his right hip on September 28, 2005, and missed the first 11 games. After playing four games, he missed the rest of the season with continual pain in his right hip.

In his third season, he started and played in 35 of the 36 games. In the Final Four loss to Florida, Shipp led the Bruins scoring (18 points), assists (5), and steals(4).

In his senior year with the Bruins, Shipp was the only player to start in all 39 games, playing in 1,269 minutes (32.5 mpg, 3rd all-time on UCLA's single-season list). Shipp was named the Bruins' co-Most Valuable Player (MVP) along with Darren Collison. He ended his career at UCLA No. 32 on the career list with 1,254 points. Shipp and fellow senior teammates Collison and Alfred Aboya finished their careers as the winningest class in UCLA history with 123 wins. The distinction was relative, as John Wooden's legendary teams played shorter seasons and freshmen were ineligible.

Professional career
Shipp was not selected in the 2009 NBA Draft, and was picked to play on the Chicago Bulls summer league team.

He signed a contract with Bornova Belediye of the Turkish Basketball League.

In July 2010, he transferred to Galatasaray Medical Park of the Turkish Basketball League.

On October 31, 2012, he signed a contract with Anadolu Efes of the Turkish Basketball League.

In October 2014, he signed a try-out contract for three weeks with Brose Baskets in Germany. According to his team he won't play any league games, but will be tested in training only. On November 10, 2014, after he passed the three-week tryout with the German powerhouse, he signed a contract for the rest of the 2014–15 season. He replaced an injured Carlon Brown. On January 11, 2015, he was released by Brose Baskets after playing 10 games in Basketball Bundesliga and seven in Eurocup.

Career statistics

Professional

Domestic leagues

European Cups

College

|-
| align="left" | 2004-05
| align="left" | UCLA Bruins
| 29 || 23 || 27.9 || .461 || .281 || .614 || 5.2 || 1.8 || 1.2 || 0.1 || 9.3
|-
| align="left" | 2005-06
| align="left" | UCLA Bruins
| 4 || 4 || 29.8 || .410 || .462 || .875 || 4.8 || 1.0 || 0.5 || 0.3 || 11.3
|-
| align="left" | 2006-07
| align="left" | UCLA Bruins
| 35 || 35 || 30.1 || .469 || .316 || .782 || 3.9 || 2.6 || 1.3 || 0.3 || 13.3
|-
| align="left" | 2007-08
| align="left" | UCLA Bruins
| 39 || 39 || 32.5 || .434 || .324 || .770 || 3.2 || 2.1 || 1.3 || 0.4 || 12.2
|-
| align="left" | 2008-09
| align="left" | UCLA Bruins
| 33 || 33 || 29.2 || .504 || .433 || .802 || 3.1 || 1.5 || 1.3 || 0.4 || 14.5
|- class="sortbottom"
| align="center" colspan=2| Career
| 140 || 134 || 29.9 || .465 || .345 || .753 || 4.0 || 1.8 || 1.1 || 0.3 || 12.1

Personal
Shipp has one older brother, Joe, who also played at Fairfax and went on to play for the California Golden Bears at the University of California, Berkeley. Joe led the Pac-10 in scoring in 2003, averaging 20.4 points. Shipp also has one younger brother, Jerren, who played at Arizona State. His sister, Brittney, is a meteorologist on television and an author.

References

External links

 Josh Shipp College Statistics at Sports-Reference.com
 UCLA Bruins Profile
 NBADraft.net Profile
 Euroleague.net Profile
 TBLStat.net Profile

1986 births
Living people
American expatriate basketball people in Germany
American expatriate basketball people in Turkey
Anadolu Efes S.K. players
Basketball players from Los Angeles
Bornova Belediye players
Brose Bamberg players
Galatasaray S.K. (men's basketball) players
Parade High School All-Americans (boys' basketball)
Shooting guards
Türk Telekom B.K. players
UCLA Bruins men's basketball players
American men's basketball players